Claudia Inés Burkart (born February 22, 1980 in Buenos Aires) is a field hockey player from Argentina who won the bronze medal with the national team at the 2004 Summer Olympics in Athens and at the 2008 Summer Olympics in Beijing. Claudia has also won two World Cups (2002, 2010), four Champions Trophy (2001, 2008, 2009, 2010), two gold medals at the Pan American Games (2003, 2007) and two Pan American Cups.

She first retired from the national team in 2010, but because of the big changes in the 2015 squad, Santiago Capurro called her in again to bring an experienced player to the team. Despite this, she was injured before competing for 2014–15 Women's FIH Hockey World League Final and was not able to compete.

References 

 Confederación Argentina de Hockey Official site of the Argentine Hockey Confederation

External links
 

Living people
1980 births
Field hockey players from Buenos Aires
Argentine female field hockey players
Las Leonas players
Olympic field hockey players of Argentina
Field hockey players at the 2007 Pan American Games
Field hockey players at the 2004 Summer Olympics
Field hockey players at the 2008 Summer Olympics
Olympic bronze medalists for Argentina
Argentine people of German descent
Olympic medalists in field hockey
Medalists at the 2008 Summer Olympics
Medalists at the 2004 Summer Olympics
Pan American Games gold medalists for Argentina
Pan American Games medalists in field hockey
B
Medalists at the 2007 Pan American Games
Medalists at the 2003 Pan American Games